John Barclay Pick (26 December 1921 – 25 January 2015), often credited as J.B. Pick, was an English poet, novelist, and biographer. He was a Quaker and a conscientious objector during the Second World War, serving in the Friends' Ambulance Unit and then as a coalminer.

Pick was born in Leicester. He was married to Gene Pick (died 2019) with two children, both sons (Peter Pick and David Pick). Pick received his education at Sidcot School, a Quaker institution in Somerset. He attended Cambridge University for a year but left at the outbreak of Second World War to join the Friends' Ambulance Unit. In the 1980s he moved to live in Balmaclellan in Galloway.

Pick was the author of the novels Out of the Pit, The Lonely Aren't Alone, Under the Crust and A Land Fit for Eros, the last co-authored with John Atkins. He also wrote a number of short stories, articles, poetry, and nonfiction works. The Last Valley (originally published in the UK in 1959 as The Fat Valley) was his first book to be published in the United States. It was later made into a film starring Omar Sharif and Michael Caine.

Works
The Last Valley Little, Brown & Co, 1959
The Strange Genius of David Lindsay: An Appreciation (1970) with E. H. Visiak and Colin Wilson
David Lindsay and the Sublime, in Cencrastus No. 2, Spring 1980, pp. 15 - 17
Neil M. Gunn: selected letters (editor), Edinburgh, Polygon, 1987

References

1921 births
2015 deaths
People from Leicester
English Quakers
British conscientious objectors
People associated with the Friends' Ambulance Unit
English biographers
20th-century English poets
20th-century English novelists
20th-century biographers